The qualification for the EuroBasket Women 2015 was split in two parts. In the first round (7–25 June 2013) teams that has not qualified for the 2013 competition were eligible to enter. Second qualifying round was held from June 7 to June 25, 2014.

First round
The first round is played from 7–25 June 2013 with the teams playing a round-robin. The top placed team from each group advanced to the semifinals.

The winner of the tournament qualified for the EuroBasket Women 2015.

Group stage

Group A
All game were played in Luxembourg.

|}

Group B
All game were played in Samokov, Bulgaria.

|}

Group C
All game were played in Helsinki, Finland.

|}

Group D
All game were played in Ramla, Israel.

|}

Knockout stage
The teams were numbered 1 to 4 according to their results in the group stage and played a two-legged series. The winners advanced to the final.

Bracket

Semifinals

First leg

Second leg

Final

First leg

Second leg

Second round
The second round was played from 7–25 June 2014 with the teams playing a round-robin. 22 teams competed in the second qualification round, vying for 11 remaining spots available to EuroBasket Women in June 2015. The teams were divided into four groups of four and two groups of three teams each. Each team played every other team in its group on a home and away basis with the six group winners and five second-best placed teams joining the already qualified teams in Hungary and Romania. These are the seeding pots used in the process of the draw.

The draw for the second qualification round was completed in Freising, Germany on 1 December 2013.

Group A

|}

Group B

|}

Group C

|}

Group D

|}

Group E

|}

Group F

|}

Ranking of second-placed teams
The five best second-placed teams from the groups qualified for the final tournament. As some groups contain four and other only three teams, the results against the fourth-placed teams were removed.

|}

References

External links
 EuroBasket Women 2015

EuroBasket Women qualification
EuroBasket Women 2015
2012–13 in European women's basketball
2013–14 in European women's basketball